The Petrești mine is a large mine in the northwest of Romania in Cluj County, 52 km north-east of Cluj-Napoca and 478 km northwest of the capital, Bucharest. Petrești represents one of the largest bentonite reserve in Romania having estimated reserves of 6.3 million tonnes.

References 

Bentonite mines in Romania